Botticini is an Italian surname. Notable people with the surname include:

 Francesco Botticini (1446–1498), Italian painter
 Raffaello Botticini (1474–1520), Italian painter, son of Francesco

See also
 Bottici

Italian-language surnames